Capillamentum is a genus of moths of the family Noctuidae.

Species
 Capillamentum galleyi Laporte, 1984
 Capillamentum nigrofasciatum Pinhey, 1956

References
 Capilamentum at Markku Savela's Lepidoptera and Some Other Life Forms
 Natural History Museum Lepidoptera genus database

Glottulinae